Get Back Up may refer to:

"Get Back Up" (T.I. song)
"Get Back Up" (TobyMac song)
"Get Back Up", a song by Airbourne from Breakin' Outta Hell
"Get Back Up", a 2020's movie
Get back up (G-Easy song)